Melvin LaForme (born February 6, 1953) is a Canadian rower.

Biography
LaForme was born in Buffalo, New York in 1953. He represented Canada in the men's eight at the 1976 Summer Olympics in Montreal, where the team came eighths. He won a gold medal at the 1985 World Rowing Championships in Hazewinkel with the men's quadruple sculls. He represented Canada in the quad scull at the 1988 Summer Olympics.

References

1953 births
Living people
Canadian male rowers
World Rowing Championships medalists for Canada
Olympic rowers of Canada
Rowers at the 1976 Summer Olympics
Rowers at the 1988 Summer Olympics
Pan American Games medalists in rowing
Pan American Games gold medalists for Canada
Pan American Games silver medalists for Canada
Rowers at the 1979 Pan American Games
Rowers at the 1983 Pan American Games
20th-century Canadian people